"Chasing Stars" is a song by Swedish record producer Alesso and American record producer Marshmello featuring English singer James Bay. It was released on 20 August 2021 via Joytime Collective and 10:22 pm/Astralwerks.

Background
Bay accepted an interview of People.com, and said: "It's reminiscent of a time that you had with somebody, then it's talking about how beautiful it was and what a wonderful time that was. [...] It was you and me against the world.' I hope it does that for people, that's what it does for me."

Music video
The music video was directed by Jake Jelicich, who also filmed music videos for Dua Lipa and Niall Horan. The video was featured as a video store, Bay worked the counter, then he browsed a few VHS tapes, subsequently he became mesmerized by "the deeply intimate, home-movie-like scenes and the beguiling woman who appears in each tape".

Credits and personnel
Credits adapted from Tidal.

 Alesso – producer, composer, lyricist,
 Marshmello – producer, composer, lyricist, associated performer, programming
 The Monsters & Strangerz – producer, composer, lyricist, associated performer, vocal producer
 Alexander Izquierdo – composer, lyricist
 James Bay – composer, lyricist, associated performer, featured artist, vocalist
 Jonathan Bellion – composer, lyricist
 Michael Pollack – composer, lyricist
 Jeremie Inhaber – assistant mixer, studio personnel
 Michelle Mancini – mastering engineer, studio personnel
 Chris Galland – mix engineer, studio personnel
 Manny Marroquin – mixer, studio personnel
 Henri Davies – recording engineer, studio personnel

Charts

Weekly charts

Year-end charts

Release history

References

2021 singles
2021 songs
Alesso songs
Marshmello songs
James Bay (singer) songs
Songs written by Alesso
Songs written by Marshmello
Songs written by James Bay (singer)
Songs written by Michael Pollack (musician)
Songs written by Eskeerdo
Song recordings produced by Alesso
Songs written by Jon Bellion
Songs written by Jordan Johnson (songwriter)
Songs written by Stefan Johnson
Song recordings produced by the Monsters & Strangerz